Genoplesium citriodorum, commonly known as the lemon-scented midge orchid is a species of small terrestrial orchid that is endemic to New South Wales. It has a single thin leaf fused to the flowering stem and up to thirty three small, lemon scented, dark purplish black flowers. It usually grows under shrubs in shallow sandstone soil in the Blue Mountains.

Description
As with others in the genus, the flowers are inverted so that the labellum is above the column rather than below it. There is a dark reddish purple callus in the centre of the labellum and extending two-thirds of the way to its tip. Flowering occurs between December and April.

Taxonomy and naming
The lemon scented midge orchid was first formally described in 1991 by David Jones and Mark Clements who gave it the name Genoplesium  citriodorum and published the description in Australian Orchid Research. In 2002, Jones and Clements changed the name to Corunastylis citriodora but the change is not accepted by the Australian Plant Census. The specific epithet (citriodorum) is derived from the Latin words citrea meaning "the citron-tree" and odor meaning "smell", referring to the strongly lemon-scented flowers.

Distribution and habitat
Genoplesium citriodorum is only known from the Blue Mountains at heights of  where it grows under shrubs in shallow soil over sandstone and sometimes in permanently wet areas.

References

citriodorum
Endemic orchids of Australia
Orchids of New South Wales
Plants described in 1991